is a shooter game released by Tomy in 1993 for the Super Famicom.

Summary
Players progress through the game as a robot racing through a pipe, shooting everything that moves. The robot can shoot from both arms, jump, kick and punch. There are also power-ups and bonuses that can be collected to upgrade the robot's weapons and armor.

There are three different types of robots to choose from: Silver Mare, Beliws, and Nitika. Weapons are chosen before each stage. Three difficulty levels can be chosen; ranging from easy, medium, and hard.

Reception

References

External links
Accele Brid at MobyGames

1993 video games
Action video games
Genki (company) games
Japan-exclusive video games
Video games about mecha
Science fiction video games
Scrolling shooters
Super Nintendo Entertainment System games
Super Nintendo Entertainment System-only games
Tomy games
Video games developed in Japan